A newspaper of record is a major national newspaper with large circulation whose editorial and news-gathering functions are considered authoritative and independent; they are thus "newspapers of record by reputation" and include some of the oldest and most widely respected newspapers in the world.  The level and trend in the number of "newspapers of record by reputation" is regarded as being related to the state of press freedom and political freedom in a country.

It may also be a newspaper authorized to publish public or legal notices, thus serving as a newspaper of public record.  A newspaper whose editorial content is largely directed by the state can be referred to as an official newspaper of record, but the lack of editorial independence means that it is not a "newspaper of record by reputation".  Newspapers of record by reputation that focus on business can also be called newspapers of financial record.

Newspapers of public record

A "newspaper of public record", or government gazette, refers to a publicly available newspaper that is authorized by a government to publish public or legal notices. It is often established by statute or official action and publication of notices within it, whether by the government or a private party, is usually considered sufficient to comply with legal requirements for public notice.  Such gazettes often have little editorial content (i.e. opinion articles), and are focused on the transmission of information to the public regarding state services and state decisions; an example is Latvia's Latvijas Vēstnesis.

In some jurisdictions, privately owned newspapers may register with the public authorities to publish public and legal notices, or be otherwise eligible to publish said notices (terms used may include "newspaper of general circulation" among others). Likewise, a private newspaper may be designated by the courts for publication of legal notices, such as notices of fictitious business names, if certain judicial and statutory standards are met. These are sometimes called "legally adjudicated newspapers".

Official newspapers of record as government communications

The term "newspapers of public record" can also be used to denote those that are owned and operated by a Government that directs their entire editorial content. Such newspapers, while pejoratively termed "state mouthpieces", can also be called "official newspapers of record", independently of whether or not it also publishes legal notices - distinguishing them from a gazette whose primary role is to publish notices, as their entire editorial copy represents the official view and doctrine of the State. This kind of official newspaper should not be confused with newspapers of record by reputation or for their reliability, and in fact are liable to fail the reputation criterial due to the level of governmental control involved. Inclusion of the word "official" can be used to separate them from "newspapers of record by reputation".  Notable examples include Russia's Rossiyskaya Gazeta, North Korea's Rodong Sinmun, and China's People's Daily.

Newspapers of record by reputation

The second type of "newspaper of record" (also known as a "journal of record", or by the French term ) is not defined by any formal criteria and their characteristics can vary. The category typically consists of those newspapers that are considered to meet higher standards of journalism than most print media, including editorial independence (particularly from the ruling government and from its owners), accountability (mistakes are acknowledged), attention to detail and accuracy, and comprehensiveness and balance of coverage; they are often renowned internationally, and regarded as sources in their country and/or region by other global outlets.

Some newspapers of record by reputation, while respected for the accuracy and quality of their reporting, can still be recognized as ideologically conservative (e.g. The Wall Street Journal and The Telegraph) or liberal (e.g. The Washington Post and The Guardian).

While many countries are proud of their newspapers of record by reputation, in some countries, they face an openly hostile state or political system that tries to suppress their press freedoms. Examples include Turkey's Cumhuriyet, where many of the staff have been imprisoned, Panama's La Prensa, where staff have been shot and the owners forced into exile, and Venezuela's El Nacional, which was effectively forced out of print by the state who seized all their assets.

Despite changes in society, newspapers of record by reputation have historically tended to maintain a similar tone, coverage, style, and traditions; many newspapers of record are over a century old, with some close to, or over, two centuries old (e.g. Neue Zürcher Zeitung, The Times, The Guardian, Le Figaro, and The Sydney Morning Herald).

Etymology
The term is believed to have originated among librarians who began referring to The New York Times as the "newspaper of record" when it became the first U.S. newspaper in 1913 to publish an index of the subjects covered in its pages. In recognition of the usage, The New York Times held an essay contest in 1927 in which entrants had to demonstrate "The Value of The New York Times Index and Files as a Newspaper of Record". The New York Times, and other newspapers of its type, then sought to be chroniclers of events, acting as a record of the day's announcements, schedules, directories, proceedings, transcripts and appointments. The New York Times no longer considers itself a newspaper of record in the original, literal sense.

Over time, historians relied on The New York Times and similar titles as a reliable archival and historical record of significant past events, and a gauge of societal opinions at the time of printing. The term "newspaper of record" evolved from its original literal sense to its currently understood meaning.

The derived term "financial (or business) newspaper of record" is attributed to the Wall Street Journal, the Financial Times, and to the Nihon Keizai Shimbun (Nikkei).

Examples of fallen newspapers

Over time, some established newspapers of record by reputation have lost their status due to various factors including financial collapse, take-over or merger by another entity that did not have the same standards or allowed continued independence, and/or increased government control and suppression of the paper's editorial independence.  The existence of newspapers of record by reputation is an aspect of the level of press freedom and political freedom in a country, with major first-world democracies having several such newspapers (e.g. United States, United Kingdom, Germany, France, Canada, Italy and Japan); in contrast, countries that have seen a decline in their newspapers of record by reputation can represent a decline in levels of personal and political freedom (e.g. Zimbabwe, Venezuela, and Cambodia).

Examples include:
Zimbabwe's The Herald, lost its status as an established newspaper of record when it was eventually taken over by Robert Mugabe's Zanu-PF party.
 Venezuela's newspaper of record, El Nacional, was forced out of print by the state in 2018, and its headquarters given to a high-ranking official.
 London-based pan-Arab newspaper of record, Al-Hayat, ceased in 2020 due to financial and political pressures.
 In Cambodia, the Hun Sen administration forced both of Cambodia's newspapers of record out of business using contrived tax fines that resulted in the closure of The Cambodia Daily in 2017, and the sale of The Phnom Penh Post to a close ally of the Hun Sen administration in 2018.
 Latvian newspaper Diena saw its established status as a newspaper of record diminished post a 2010 takeover, with the Historical Dictionary of Latvia (2017) listing it as "holding tenuously to a popular newspaper-of-record sentiment at home and abroad" due to "questions of ownership and if said owners influence newspaper content".

Selected existing examples

See also
 Freedom of the press
 Grupo de Diarios América
 List of national newspapers
 List of government gazettes

Notes

References

Newspapers by type
Newspaper terminology
Public records
Lists of publications
Lists of newspapers